Reuterella is a genus of damp barklice in the family Elipsocidae. There is at least one described species in Reuterella, R. helvimacula.

References

Further reading

 

Elipsocidae